Sport Club Binningen is a Swiss football club based in Binningen.

Founded in 1920, the club competes in 2. Liga, the fifth tier of the Swiss Football League. They play at Spiegelfeld, a stadium in Binningen which opened in 2005 and has a capacity of 1,300. The club has competed in the Swiss Cup on a regular basis.

References

External links

Profile at Swiss Football Association

Association football clubs established in 1920
Football clubs in Switzerland
SC Binningen